Catfishing is a deceptive activity in which a person creates a fictional persona or fake identity on a social networking service, usually targeting a specific victim. The practice may be used for financial gain, to compromise a victim in some way, as a way to intentionally upset a victim, or for wish fulfillment. Catfishing television shows have been produced, often featuring victims who wish to identify their catfisher. Celebrities have been targeted, which has brought press attention to catfishing practices.

History

Etymology
The modern term originated from the 2010 American documentary Catfish. The documentary follows Nev Schulman, the executive producer, as a victim of catfishing. He had cultivated a friendship with what he thought was an 18-year-old girl from the Midwestern United States and her family. The woman with whom he had been communicating was actually a 40-year-old housewife. In the documentary, the woman's husband makes a comparison between the woman’s behaviour and a mythical use for literal catfish in the shipping of live cod fish. 

The myth is that cod were shipped with catfish in the same tanks in order to keep the cod active, ensuring the quality of the cod, whereas when shipped alone the cod would become pale and lethargic. This myth originated in the fiction writing of Henry Nevinson (1913, Essays in Rebellion) and Charles Marriott (1913, The Catfish).

The term catfishing has become more widely known throughout the subsequent decade, thanks to a television series which followed the main star of the movie, Yaniv (Nev) Schulman, helping other people investigate their possible catfish situations.

The term also spiked in popularity during an incident involving University of Notre Dame football star Manti Te'o in 2013.

Practice and sociology 
Catfishing has been thought to have grown in popularity as it allows participants to disassociate from one's everyday identity, shielding from moral obligation or responsibility. This is attributed to the online disinhibition effect, due to which online users feel more comfortable sharing information, some of which may be untrue, on an online forum than through in person communication.

In catfishing, an internet user uses a fake identity to persuade another person to believe they are the person they portray. This often is used for relationships, such as the scenario in the movie Catfish. The person catfishing uses another person's photos and life facts to make them appear as a real person. Often, the person who this identity has been molded from does not know that their pictures and name are being used. They are unaware that their identity was used to create these fake relationships online. The person uses catfishing in order to appear as a better version of themselves by using a fake identity. Their primary reason to appear as a fake person is to befriend the other person for a relationship, sexual reasons or financial gain.

Some online users have used catfishing to explore their gender and/or sexual identities. Known this way as a type of romance scam, catfishing is often employed on dating websites however the use of social media or email will serve for scammers as a way to make initial contact. For example, on the MTV show Catfish, based on the documentary film, a girl named Sonny connects with a male model named Jamison who is, in reality, Chelsea, a woman using her alternative identity to interact romantically with other women in an online space.

Financial gain can be another motive of catfishing. In 2015, three girls created a fake social media profile and managed to steal $3,300 from the Islamic State, a terrorist group. The three girls had been approached by a recruitment officer to join the organization. After coming into contact the three girls proceeded and asked for money to travel to Syria. When they received the money, the girls immediately deleted their internet account and pocketed the cash that was intended for their own personal travel.

Catfishing has also been used as a tactic to stop criminal activity. In 2004, Dateline NBC produced the segment, To Catch a Predator, which documented undercover cops posing as minors online to catch pedophiles. Pedophiles would then be lured into spaces arranged by the undercover officers where an encounter between the posed minor and the adult were to occur.

Catfishing can also be used as a tactic to cyberbully someone by attacking other individuals online working under a fake or anonymous identity.  Since they are using another person's identity or a made-up identity, the person is less likely to get in trouble or have any consequences as the cyberbullying is more difficult to be traced back to them.

Dangers
Catfishing can be used to attract a person from the Internet and allow them to meet them in person. The person catfishing can lure a victim to a place to be kidnapped, or hurt in another way. Sexual predators use fake identities to talk to teens, allowing them to get close to them so that the victim will trust them. This then allows for the predator to get information from the victim to use that information to potentially harm them. Examples of this are the 2002 murder of Kacie Woody and 2007 murder of Carly Ryan.

Catfishing as a way to harass others online also has increased the number of suicides in teens as mental abuse is involved, an example being the 2006 suicide of Megan Meier.

Signs
Although subjective, there are multiple warning signs attributed to catfishing behavior:

If an unknown person starts following or messaging a user and the person's profile picture looks fake or too good to be true.
If profiles between dating and social media sites are inconsistent, for example having different names or pictures between websites.
If after a few encounters the opposing party starts proclaiming love, especially after only a few days or weeks of contact.
If a person refuses to send photos of themselves or talk on the phone.

Legal cases 
The first successful civil claim relating to a catfishing scam in the UK, and in the common law world (Kirat Assi v Simran Kaur Bhogal) was won in June 2021 after Kirat, a British radio presenter, discovered she was a victim of a nine year catfishing campaign perpetrated by her younger cousin Simran, a former Barclays Investment banker.

Notable instances

Alicia Kozakiewicz 
Beginning sometime in 20002001, 13-year-old Alicia Kozakiewicz befriended an individual she believed was a boy her age in a Yahoo chat room. On January1, 2002, he invited Kozakiewicz to meet him near her Pittsburgh, Pennsylvania home. The boy was actually 38-year-old Scott Tyree from Herndon, Virginia, who, after coercing Kozakiewicz into his vehicle, drove her to his home where he held her captive, shackled, raped and tortured her in his basement dungeon while live streaming online. A Florida viewer recognized Kozakiewicz from news stories and a National Center for Missing & Exploited Children flier, and gave an anonymous tip to the Federal Bureau of Investigation (FBI). After tracing Tyree's IP address, FBI stormed the house on January 4 and freed Kozakiewicz at 4:10 PM. Kozakiewicz has gone on to become a motivational speaker, Internet safety and missing persons advocate, and has founded The Alicia Project.

Kacie Woody 
In 2002, 13-year-old Kacie Woody (screen name: modelbehavior63), from Arkansas began an online friendship with a supposedly 17-year-old boy named Dave Fagen (screen name: jazzman_df) from California. "Dave Fagen", whose profile picture was of a young man, was actually 47-year-old David Fuller from La Mesa. Fuller traveled to Arkansas and abducted Woody from her home on the night of December 3. After an investigation by Arkansas law enforcement and the FBI, Woody and Fuller's bodies were found the next day in Fuller's rented minivan inside Guardsmart Storage in Conway. Fuller had sedated Woody with chloroform, bound, raped and shot her in the head before shooting himself upon law enforcement's arrival. Woody's friends and family subsequently founded the Kacie Woody Foundation in order to educate parents and children about Internet safety, and her case appeared on the Investigation Discovery TV shows "Web of Lies" and "Man With a Van."

Suicide of Megan Meier 
The suicide of Megan Meier in October 2006 was attributed to Lori Drew, a neighbor of the Meiers and the mother of Megan's friend Sarah, who had created a fake account in order to cyberbully Megan for allegedly spreading gossip about Sarah. Sarah and several other people were also involved. On MySpace, Megan had received a friend request from a supposedly 16-year-old boy named "Josh Evans", who claimed to have recently moved to a nearby city, O'Fallon, Missouri. The two became friends; however, on October 16, Josh began sending increasingly hurtful messages to Megan, the last of which told her that the world would be a better place without her. Megan had become upset, and after being confronted by her mother, Tina, for not signing off when she was told, ran to her bedroom. A while later, when Tina went to Megan's room to check on her, she found that Megan had hanged herself with a belt inside her closet. Attempts to revive her failed, and Megan was pronounced dead the next day, three weeks before her 14th birthday. About a year later, the scheme behind the account was discovered. In 2008, a jury indicted and convicted Lori of violations of the Computer Fraud and Abuse Act in connection with the incident, but the conviction was later vacated by a federal judge on a post-trial verdict, on grounds that the act did not intend to criminalize Drew's alleged conduct. The government decided against appealing the ruling. In 2009, Drew was also acquitted of cyberbullying in United States v. Drew. Tina founded the Megan Meier Foundation, an organization intended to fight cyberbullying.

Carly Ryan 
In 2006, 14-year-old Carly Ryan from South Australia befriended and began dating an American-Australian teen named Brandon Kane over MySpace. "Kane" turned out to be Garry Francis Newman, who in January 2007 travelled from Melbourne to attend Carly's 15th birthday party and give her presents, while posing as Kane's father Shane, but after behaving erratically and inappropriately, her mother Sonya told him to leave. About three weeks later, Carly left the house apparently to have a sleepover with friends, but after being reported missing when she didn’t return home the next morning, her body was found floating in Horseshoe Bay in Port Elliot. She had been beaten, smothered in beach sand and then thrown into the ocean to drown. An investigation led back to Newman, who was arrested and, in January 2010, found guilty of Carly’s murder and sentenced to life in prison with a 29-year non-parole period. Carly's mother, Sonya Ryan, founded the Carly Ryan Foundation, which successfully lobbied for "Carly's Law" being enacted in order to protect Australian minors online.

Thomas Montgomery and Mary Shieler 
Thomas Montgomery (screen name: marinesniper), a 47-year-old married man, pretending to be an 18-year-old male Marine named "Tommy", ended up in a love triangle with Mary Shieler (screen name: talhotblond), a middle-aged married woman pretending to be an 18-year-old woman named "Jessi", and a co-worker of Montgomery's, 22-year-old Brian Barrett (screen name: beefcake). As a result of jealousy, Montgomery murdered Barrett, and the deceptions unraveled. These events were covered in a 2009 documentary film, Talhotblond and a subsequent movie adaptation.

University of Virginia rape hoax story 
According to a Washington Post article, the Rolling Stone University of Virginia rape hoax story may have been an example of catfishing where a young woman posed online as another student after the young man she had a romantic interest in did not reciprocate. The young woman posed as a made-up upperclassman student online in order to stay in communication with her love interest.

Lincoln Lewis 
The identity of an Australian actor, Lincoln Lewis, was used by an impostor over four years. The actions resulted in the suicide of one victim, who had at one point reached out to the real Lincoln Lewis as they had attended primary school together, so the victim was familiar with some aspects of his life that were discovered and exploited by the perpetrator. The perpetrator, who turned out to be a female, Lydia Abdelmalek, operated from at least mid-2011 until arrested in mid-2016, and in early 2019 was found guilty of stalking six people.

See also

References

External links
 

Deception
Internet fraud
Social networks
Cybercrime
Online child abuse